Conrad or Kurt Christoph von Königsmarck (24 March 1634 – 31 October 1673) was a Dutch-Swedish military leader.

He was the son of Hans Christoff von Königsmarck and Agathe von Leesten and the brother of Otto Wilhelm von Königsmarck and Beata Elisabet von Königsmarck.

Career
Königsmarck received an education despite the war and later joined the Swedish army. He took part in the bloody battle near Warsaw in 1656. In 1658 under Charles X command during the crossing over the frozen Great Belt Bridge to Funen he was caught by the Danes and was left free only after the Peace of Roskilde. In 1663 after the death of his father he became a vice-governor of the Duchy of Bremen-Verden and commander of Stade.

He served the stadthouder William III of Orange in Bodegraven during the Rampjaar. When 10,000 French troops under the command of François-Henri de Montmorency, duc de Luxembourg arrived over the frozen ice of the Hollandic Water Line from Woerden on 27 December 1672, he retreated to Leiden. There the councilman Cornelis Hop and others kept the gates closed and ordered him back to Alphen aan de Rijn in order to defend the Water Line at Gouwsluis. His retreat enabled the Duke of Luxembourg to murder all at Bodegraven and Zwammerdam and he prepared to make an attack on The Hague. A sudden thaw forced them back to Woerden however, but Königsmarck was seen as a coward.

Königsmarck was killed in the Siege of Bonn by an accidental cannon shot from friendly side on 10 October 1673 at the age of 39.
In a year his body was reburied in Stade. He was known for his charitable gifts, as for example a rebuilding of burnt church in Stade in 1659.

Personal life
He married Countess Maria Christina von Wrangel, the daughter of Count Hermann von Wrangel and their children were:
 Karl Johann von Königsmarck
 Maria Aurora von Königsmarck
 Amalia Wilhelmina von Königsmarck
 Philip Christoph von Königsmarck

References

1634 births
1673 deaths
Swedish military personnel